"Secret Story of the Swan" is a song recorded by South Korean girl group Iz*One. It is the lead single in their third extended play Oneiric Diary. It was released on June 15, 2020, by Off the Record and Swing Entertainment. It is the first release after their postponed title track "Fiesta".

Background and release 

On March 9, 2020, Pledis Entertainment founder and chief executive officer Han Sung-soo announced he would step down from co-managing Iz*One after their first studio album, Bloom*Iz. On March 10, a day later, it was reported that Swing Entertainment would take part in managing the group. A source from the agency confirmed the reports and that Swing would co-manage the group. On May 19, Iz*One shared a notice via their FanCafe, that they would be releasing their fourth extended play (EP) on June 15. It announced the members were in the last stage of production and are releasing a higher quality performance. On June 1, Iz*One released an album trailer announcing the name for their album being Oneiric Diary. On June 8, the track list for the album was released, revealing the title track to be "Secret Story of the Swan", along with seven other tracks, one being written by Hitomi, with Nako and Sakura writing the Japanese version of the song. On June 11, the teaser for the music video was released, with a second being released a day later. The music video ended up being delayed a day later, set to be released the same day as the album, but was released on June 16.

Composition 
"Secret Story of the Swan" is an EDM track composed in G minor, a tempo of 103 bpm, and the  common-time signature. The song is about becoming who you've dreamed of becoming deep in your heart. Iz*One portray themselves as the protagonists of a fairytale in the lyrics. As the song literally means "Fantasy Fairytale", it was written, arranged, and composed, by MosPick. The Japanese version of the song was also written by members Nako and Sakura along with MosPick.

Promotion 
Iz*One made their comeback stage on M! Countdown along with other artists such as WJSN, Stray Kids, and N.Flying.

Commercial performance
On the South Korean Gaon Digital Chart, the song debuted at number six, becoming the group's second top ten hit in the country. The song also peaked at number 11 on the US World Digital Song Sales, becoming their highest-charting entry on the chart since "Violeta". On the K-pop Hot 100, the song arrived at number five, becoming their third top 10 entry.

Music video 
Their music video, even as it was delayed a day, was released on June 16, 2020. In the video, Iz*One portray the protagonists of their own fairytale, matching the lyrical content. On June 23, a performance version was released as well.

Accolades

Music program wins 
Iz*One took their first win for the song on June 23, on The Show against N.Flying's "Oh Really" and Weki Meki's "Oopsy". With a total of seven wins on different music programs, the song tied "Violeta" as their most awarded song.

Charts

See also 
 List of M Countdown Chart winners (2020)

References

Iz*One songs
2020 singles
2020 songs
Korean-language songs